The 1828 Indiana gubernatorial election took place on August 4, 1828 under the provisions of the Constitution of Indiana. It was the fifth gubernatorial election in the State of Indiana. James B. Ray, the incumbent governor, was re-elected, defeating Israel T. Canby, the former state senator representing Jefferson and Jennings counties, and Harbin H. Moore, the outgoing speaker of the Indiana House of Representatives, in a three-way race. The election took place concurrently with races for lieutenant governor and members of the Indiana General Assembly.

Ray won the 1825 Indiana gubernatorial election after succeeding to the governorship upon the resignation of William Hendricks, who had stepped down to accept a seat in the United States Senate. From the beginning, his tenure was controversial: opponents alleged Ray was yet shy of the minimum age of thirty years when he took the oath of office, and his ascension as such had been unconstitutional. (In fact, Ray turned thirty a few days after his inauguration, but continued to serve as governor regardless.) Following his re-election to a full term in August 1825, Ray attempted to steer a middle course between the emerging Jacksonian and Anti-Jacksonian factions in federal politics. His independent stance attracted criticisms from both camps, as did his acceptance of a federal commission in 1826 to negotiate the Treaty of Mississinewas, which appeared to violate the constitutional prohibition against governors serving in federal employ during their tenure in office. The General Assembly debated whether Ray had forfeited his office by accepting the commission, and separately, whether he had neglected his duties by absenting himself from the capital for long periods. Indiana State Treasurer Samuel Merrill attacked Ray publicly, alleging the governor to be "destitute of principle and all sense of propriety," and accusing him of embezzling public funds. Ultimately, an investigative committee found no evidence of wrongdoing, and a resolution calling for Ray's removal was defeated in the House by a vote of 31 to 27.

For the first time, presidential politics played a significant role in the gubernatorial election. The 1828 United States presidential election pitted President John Quincy Adams against challenger Andrew Jackson four years after Adams narrowly bested Jackson in a hard-fought campaign that had to be decided by the U.S. House of Representatives. Partisan allegiances were in flux; attempting to remain above the fray, Ray faced opposition from supporters of both Adams and Jackson, the former calling themselves "National Republicans" or "Adams men," the latter "Democratic Republicans," "Jacksonians," or "Democrats." Canby and Moore were known to favor Jackson and Adams, respectively, in the national election, and Canby in particular sought to nationalize the race by campaigning for votes on the basis of his Jacksonian credentials; however, there were no formal party nominations, and Ray himself deliberately avoided stating a presidential preference, writing "the Governor has nothing to do in making a president." While some partisan behavior by voters is discernible, Ray drew support from both "Adams" and "Jackson" men, and boasted afterwards that he "was not elected by the friends of either side in a party controversy." Historian Donald Carmony sees the election as showing some evidence of national party activity while retaining the regional and personal politics of early elections; Dorothy Riker and Gayle Thornbrough classify the candidates as non-partisan.

Candidates
Opposition to Ray's re-election abounded as the 1828 election came into view. The dispute with Merrill, while acrimonious, remained personal in nature, and failed to mobilize the public against him. Far more damaging was Ray's studied neutrality in the brewing rematch between Adams and Jackson. For the first time since 1816, (when Indiana's electoral votes were awarded by the state legislature,) the presidential and gubernatorial contests would occur in the same year. Supporters of Adams and Jackson held their presidential preference in mind as they considered the candidates for governor. Attempting to appeal to both factions, Ray pleased neither. His position attracted rivals from across the political spectrum, and Ray had to endure attacks from both Jacksonians and Anti-Jacksonians throughout the campaign.

Adams (Anti-Jacksonian) candidacies
Ray feared a challenger backed by supporters of President Adams would split the electorate along partisan lines. In 1824 he had supported Henry Clay for president but preferred Jackson over Adams in the ensuing contingent election in the House of Representatives. While the 1825 gubernatorial election had not been fought along partisan lines, Ray's opponent in that contest, Chief Justice Isaac Blackford, was a known "Adams man." Blackford, Lieutenant Governor John H. Thompson, and Speaker Moore were each proposed as potential candidates for governor in the winter of 1827-28. All three were known to favor Adams in the approaching presidential election; Moore had actually been a delegate to the Adams State Convention in January 1828 that nominated a slate of electors pledged to Adams and adopted a platform defending the policies of the administration.

Thompson was the leading candidate against Ray until early April, when Moore's candidacy began to pick up steam. No candidate was ever formally endorsed as the "Adams" or "National Republican" nominee for governor, though Moore's presidential preference was known publicly and remarked on in the strategic considerations of the rival Jacksonians.

Jacksonian candidacies
Israel Canby emerged as the early favorite among Jacksonians in 1828; a physician and member of the state senate from Madison, he had been a delegate to the Jackson State Conventions of 1824 and 1828. When the 1828 convention adjourned, some Jacksonians went away with the understanding that Canby had been nominated for governor. Canby, however, had determined to withdraw his candidacy for personal considerations.

In early May, as it became apparent Ray would be opposed in the gubernatorial election by an Adams man, the Jackson State Committee saw fit to approach the governor with the offer of an endorsement. Ray wrote in reply that the committee could "dispose of me and my name as you in your wisdom see fit," that he would not commit himself to either candidate for president but would nonetheless welcome "the united support of the Jacksonians" in the August election. He asked only that Jacksonian support, were it forthcoming, remain private until after the election to avoid any appearance of partisanship. Subsequent events would cause Canby to re-enter the race in early July with less than a month left in the campaign.

Campaign
Twelve years after statehood, Indiana was still a frontier state, and enthusiasm for internal improvements was unanimous and bipartisan. In his address to the electorate, Canby declared himself a supporter of the American System of protectionism and federal infrastructure spending; Ray similarly praised the economic policies of the Adams Administration and as governor had overseen the acquisition by treaty of land for the Michigan Road. 

The Jacksonians sought to make an issue of the upcoming presidential election, which due to the staggered electoral calendar would be held in November, two months after the gubernatorial contest. In the address announcing his candidacy, Canby described the choice between Adams and Jackson as one of principle rather than personality: Jackson's defeat in the 1825 contingent election, despite a plurality of both the popular vote and the electoral college in his favor, was an affront to the right of the people to elect the president. Despite intense pressure to declare a preference, Ray remained steadfastly neutral in the presidential contest, decrying the spirit of partisanship endemic in state politics.

Campaigning was conducted, not only by sympathetic editors in the press, but by the candidates themselves. Ray conducted a tour of ten counties in the company of U.S. Representative Thomas H. Blake, addressing crowds in Brookville, Lawrenceburg and Vincennes. Ray's incumbency was an asset to his campaign, as he was better known to the public than either Canby or Moore, who could not rival the governor's long-established reputation.

Augustus Jocelyn interview
In June the pro-Adams editor of the Brookville Repository, Augustus Jocelyn, published an interview with Ray that dealt a severe blow to the governor's budding alliance with the Jacksonians. Jocelyn quoted Ray as denouncing claims that the 1824 presidential election had been stolen from Jackson and stating the Jackson party as "an outrageous and violent faction" which it was "the duty of every good man" to oppose.  In response, the Jackson State Committee cut all ties with Ray and published in full their previous correspondence, and Canby, his private business now concluded, re-emerged as a candidate for governor.

Carmony describes Ray's defense of the interview and his reply to the Jacksonian accusations against him as characteristically "lengthy and meandering." Professing to admire Adams and Jackson equally, Ray declared he would "be governed by measures and not men" and flatly denied the relevance of presidential politics in the gubernatorial election. His alliance with the Jackson party had been only prospective, in the event the Adams faction were to mount a partisan campaign against him; as for his description of Jacksonians as "outrageous and violent," Ray said, the remark was entirely Jocelyn's invention.

Results
Ray defeated his two opponents less than 40% of the statewide vote, polling strongest in the counties of the Whitewater Valley. Canby's support came mostly from southern counties that would go on to favor Jackson in the October presidential election, as well as Terre Haute, while Moore carried a total of nine counties along the periphery of the state.

The relationship between presidential party identity and voter behavior in the gubernatorial election is ambiguous. Carmony writes that while the election results show some degree of correlation between presidential preference and gubernatorial politics, "local and personal preferences remained strong." Ray carried thirty-two counties, winning votes from both Jacksonians and Anti-Jacksonians in equal numbers. Despite this, he became the first governor to be elected with less than a majority of the votes.

Results by county

Notes

References

Bibliography

Political history of Indiana
1816